A list of films produced by the Marathi language film industry based in Maharashtra in the year 1943.

1943 Releases
A list of Marathi films released in 1943.

References

External links
Gomolo - 

Lists of 1943 films by country or language
1943
1943 in Indian cinema